The National Minimum Wage (Enforcement Notices) Act 2003 (c 8) was an Act of the Parliament of the United Kingdom.

The whole Act was repealed on 6 April 2009 by section 20 of, and Part 2 of the Schedule to, the Employment Act 2008.

Section 1 - Enforcement notices
This section inserted sections 19(2A) and (2B) of the National Minimum Wage Act 1998.

Section 2 - Short title, commencement and extent
Section 2(2) provided that the Act came into force at the end of the period of two months that began on the date on which it was passed. The word "months" means calendar months. The day (that is to say, 8 May 2003) on which the Act was passed (that is to say, received royal assent) is included in the period of two months. This means that the Act came into force on 8 July 2003.

Section 2(4) was excluded by section 3A(5) of the Agricultural Wages (Scotland) Act 1949 (as inserted by regulation 2 of the Agricultural Wages (Scotland) Act 1949 Amendment Regulations 2003) (SSI 2003/283)

References
Halsbury's Statutes,

External links
The National Minimum Wage (Enforcement Notices) Act 2003, as amended from the National Archives.
The National Minimum Wage (Enforcement Notices) Act 2003, as originally enacted from the National Archives.
Explanatory notes to the National Minimum Wage (Enforcement Notices) Act 2003.

United Kingdom Acts of Parliament 2003